Natacha Atlas (born 20 March 1964) is an Egyptian-Belgian singer known for her fusion of Arabic and  Western music, particularly hip-hop. She once termed her music "cha'abi moderne" (modern popular music). Her music has been influenced by many styles including Maghrebain,  hip hop,  drum and bass and reggae.

Atlas began her career as part of the world fusion group Transglobal Underground. In 1995, she began to focus on her solo career with the release of Diaspora. She has since released seven solo albums and been a part of numerous collaborations. Her version of "Mon amie la rose" became a surprise success in France, reaching 16 on the French Singles Charts in 1999. Her most recent creation Myriad Road was released on 23 October 2015. It was produced by French Lebanese jazz musician Ibrahim Maalouf.

Early life
Natacha Atlas was born in Brussels of Anglo Egyptian parentage. Her British mother was born Christian becoming Buddhist in the 1970s. Her father, of Egyptian descent, deeply interested in Sufi mysticism and the Gurdjieff philosophy of the fourth way, also studied Chinese medicine and Taoism.

Atlas was raised listening to music from both east and west and in the course of her upbringing learned to be tolerant of all religions.

After her parents separated, Atlas went to live in Northampton, England with her mother.

Atlas grew up speaking French and English, and later learned Arabic and Spanish. She sings in several languages, including in modern colloquial Arabic, although she admits that she is not entirely at ease in it.

Early career and Transglobal Underground
Atlas returned to Belgium at age 24 and began her career with two jobs: belly dancing and being the lead singer of a Belgian salsa band. In April 1989, she made her recording début as guest vocalist on Balearic beat-band ¡Loca!'s "Encantador" (Nation Records).
In 1991, Atlas co-wrote/recorded the ¡Loca! single "Timbal" and co-wrote/guested with Jah Wobble's Invaders of the Heart composing five tracks for their Rising Above Bedlam album (Oval Records). Through recording with ¡Loca!, she met Nation-labelmates Transglobal Underground (TGU), a British ethnic electronica band with a Middle Eastern/South Asian focus. At the time, TGU had a top 40 hit, "Templehead", and Atlas became their lead singer / belly dancer. Additionally in 1991, Atlas collaborated with Bauhaus/Love and Rockets/Tones on Tail guitarist and vocalist Daniel Ash on his debut solo album Coming Down. She contributed extensive vocal work as well as keyboards and bass guitar.

Solo career
Most of Atlas' earlier albums were produced by Tim Whelan and Hamilton Lee from Transglobal Underground. Diaspora (1995), Halim (1997) (in honour of Egyptian singer Abdel Halim Hafez), Gedida (1998) and Ayeshteni (2001).

Atlas has always spoken her mind about the way both she and Transglobal Underground were seen by the UK press back in the late '90s/early 2000s. "Someone from the New Musical Express rang us about a feature we're to do with them and said 'We don't want it to be about the multi-cultural angle'. In other words that fad is over. And I'm personally insulted... what other angle is there for us?! I get sick of it all."

In 1999, Atlas collaborated with David Arnold on the song "One Brief Moment".  The single featured a cover version of the theme song from the James Bond film You Only Live Twice. Two years earlier, Atlas had collaborated with Arnold on the album Shaken and Stirred, recording the song "From Russia with Love" for the eponymous film (originally performed by Matt Monro).

Also in 1999, she collaborated with Jean-Michel Jarre for the track "C'est La Vie" on his album Métamorphoses. The track was released as a single.

In 2003, Atlas provided vocals for the Kolo folk dance song "'Ajde Jano" on Nigel Kennedy and Kroke's album, East Meets East.  In 2005, Atlas contributed the song "Just Like A Dream" (from Something Dangerous) to the charity album Voyces United for UNHCR.

Her music has been used in a number of soundtracks. Her song "Kidda" was featured on the Sex and the City 2 soundtrack and in the 2005 video game Grand Theft Auto: Liberty City Stories on Radio del Mundo. In 2003, her voice is heard in Hulk in the song "Captured". Additionally, her song "Bathaddak" is one of the songs included in the 2007 Xbox 360 exclusive video game Project Gotham Racing 4. Her cover of I Put a Spell On You was used in the 2002 film Divine Intervention by Palestinian director Elia Suleiman.

Atlas was originally billed to star in and provide the soundtrack to the film Whatever Lola Wants, directed by Nabil Ayouch. However, shooting delays caused Atlas to only be involved in the film's soundtrack. Her song "Gafsa" (Halim, 1997) was used as the main soundtrack during the Korean film Bin-Jip (also known as 3-Iron) (2004) by Kim Ki-Duk. She participated in the piece "Light of Life (Ibelin Reprise)" for the soundtrack of Ridley Scott's Kingdom of Heaven.

In 2007, Atlas collaborated with Belinda Carlisle for Carlisle's seventh album Voila. She contributed additional vocals on songs "Ma Jeunesse Fout Le Camp," "La Vie En Rose", "Bonnie et Clyde" and "Des Ronds Dans L'Eau." Voila was released via Rykodisc in the U.K. on 5 February 2007 and in the U.S. the following day.

The 2007 film Brick Lane features four songs with vocals by Atlas, "Adam's Lullaby", "Running Through the Night", "Love Blossoms" and "Rite of Passage". On 23 May 2008 Atlas released a new album, Ana Hina, which was well received by critics.

In 2008, two of Atlas' songs, "Kidda" and "Ghanwa Bossanova", were used in Shamim Sarif's romantic comedy about two women, I Can't Think Straight.

In 2008, she sang lead in the song "Habibe" from Peter Gabriel's long-awaited album and project, Big Blue Ball.

On 20 September 2010 Atlas released Mounqaliba. Co-produced by Samy Bishai, it explored classical instrumentation, jazz and traditional Arabic styles and was inspired by the poems of Indian poet Rabindranath Tagore. She is also composing the music for Francoise Charpat's upcoming film.

In May 2013, Natacha Atlas released Expressions: Live in Toulouse, an album which showcased her expressive voice using largely orchestral arrangements augmented by Middle Eastern percussion.

Atlas has recently moved into the jazz genre with Myriad Road (2015) and Strange Days (2019).

Personal life
In 1999, Atlas married Syrian kanun player Abdullah Chhadeh. The couple divorced in 2005.

, Atlas was in a relationship with British Egyptian violinist Samy Bishai, who produced her 2010 release Mounqaliba. The couple divide their time between London and France.

Atlas has said in the past that she is "technically Muslim" and that she identifies with Sufism. She also stated that her father has some Sephardic Jewish ancestry. Atlas said more recently, "These days I prefer to say that I'm Anglo-Middle Eastern and leave the religion out of it." She is, however, open to other forms of spirituality because "it's important to be tolerant".

In 2001, she was appointed by Mary Robinson as a Goodwill Ambassador for the United Nations Conference Against Racism. Robinson chose Atlas because "she embodies the message that there is a strength in diversity. That our differences – be they ethnic, racial or religious – are a source of riches to be embraced rather than feared". She was a Goodwill Ambassador for the United Nations Conference Against Racism.

Atlas is a proponent of The Zeitgeist Movement. She included clips from Zeitgeist: Addendum in her 2010 album Mounqaliba.

Political views on Israel
In a joint interview with the Israeli singer Yasmin Levy, Atlas noted the risk of the collaboration because feelings of anti-Zionism across the Arab world can spill over into anti-Semitism “Some Arabic artists wouldn't even consider working with anyone Jewish.” Of her experience of working with Levy, Atlas said:

“We spent a lot of time in this little room, just talking and drinking wine”, recalls Natacha, “and it was like I’d known her all my life. I’d missed that female Middle Eastern company, as most of the Middle Eastern people I know here are men.”

In March 2011, Atlas announced that she had joined the boycott of Israel and had withdrawn from a scheduled performance in Israel. She gave her reasoning as follows:

"I would have personally asked my Israeli fans face-to-face to fight this apartheid with peace in their hearts, but after much deliberation I now see that it would be more effective a statement to not go to Israel until this systemized apartheid is abolished once and for all."

By May 2014, when she gave a concert at the Méditerranée Festival in Ashdod, Atlas had clearly changed her mind on the issue of boycott:

“For years,” Natacha Atlas told me, “I boycotted Israel and refused to perform here. But when I met a Palestinian fellow who’s married to an Israeli Jewish woman, something in me changed. Suddenly, this chance personal acquaintanceship made me think that maybe there should be another way. There’s nothing easier than to boycott and say that I don’t want to see Israel or meet Israelis or come here and perform. But then what? Where does that get you?”

Discography

Compilation albums
 2000: The Remix Collection
 2005: The Best of Natacha Atlas
 2013:  Five Albums' (Her First 5 Albums In A Box Set) (Banquet)
 2013: Habibi: Classics and Collaborations (2CD) (Nascente/Demon Music Group)

DVD
 2005: Transglobal Underground 2009: The Pop Rose of Cairo''

See also
 List of Natacha Atlas collaborations
 World music
 Arabic pop music
 Yasmin Levy

References

External links

 

1964 births
Arabic-language singers
20th-century French women singers
French Muslims
20th-century Belgian women singers
20th-century Belgian singers
Belgian film actresses
Belgian television actresses
Egyptian film actresses
Egyptian television actresses
Tunisian film actresses
Tunisian television actresses
Belgian Muslims
Belgian people of Egyptian descent
Belgian people of English descent
Belgian people of Jewish descent
English-language singers from Belgium
French-language singers of Belgium
Living people
People from Schaerbeek
People from Northampton
Folk-pop singers
Transglobal Underground members
Six Degrees Records artists
Harmonia Mundi artists
Nation Records artists
21st-century Belgian women singers
21st-century Belgian singers
Whirlwind Recordings artists